The 2010–11 Amlin Challenge Cup was the 15th season of the European Challenge Cup, Europe's second-tier club rugby union competition, and the second to be sponsored by the British insurance company Amlin. The tournament began on 7 October 2010, with the final played on 20 May 2011 at Cardiff City Stadium, the day before the 2011 Heineken Cup Final in the same city at Millennium Stadium. A total of 23 teams from six countries participated. The competition began with 20 teams; three more teams that began their seasons in the Heineken Cup parachuted into the knockout stage. Cardiff Blues did not defend their title, as by winning the 2009–10 cup, they qualified for the 2010–11 Heineken Cup, and did not parachute into the Challenge Cup.

Harlequins claimed the title with a 19–18 win over Stade Français, becoming the first team to win the Challenge Cup three times. The victory also sent Quins into the 2011–12 Heineken Cup.

Teams
The allocation of teams is as follows:
 England: 6 teams — all teams from the Aviva Premiership that did not qualify for the Heineken Cup
 France: 7 teams — all teams from the Top 14 that did not qualify for the Heineken Cup. Normally 8 teams, but Toulouse's win in the 2009–10 Heineken Cup gave France an extra place in the 2010–11 Heineken Cup.
 Italy: 4 teams — the top four teams from the 2009–10 Super 10 (now Top12) that did not move to the Celtic League for 2010–11
 Ireland: 1 team — the Irish team that failed to qualify for the Heineken Cup through the Magners League
 Spain: 1 team — the champion of the previous season's División de Honor
 Romania: 1 team specially created for the competition

Seeding
Teams that did not qualify for the 2010–11 Heineken Cup were ordered into four tiers according to the European Rugby Club Ranking. Five pools of four teams were drawn comprising one team from each tier.

The brackets show each team's European Rugby Club Ranking at the end of the 2009–10 season.

Pool stage

The draw for the pool stage took place on 9 June 2010.

{| class="wikitable"
|+ Key to colours
|-
|bgcolor="#ccffcc"|    
|Winner of each pool advances to quarterfinals.Seed # in parentheses.
|}

Pool 1

Pool 2

Pool 3

Pool 4

Pool 5

Knockout stage

Seeding
Following the end of the pool stage, the 5 pool winners were seeded alongside the top 3 2010–11 Heineken Cup pool runners-up who failed to qualify for the Heineken Cup quarter-finals.

(HC) Means a team has entered the competition from the Heineken Cup

Quarter-finals
The quarter-finals were decided based on the above seeding. All game times are local.

Semi-finals
The draw for the semi-finals of both the Heineken Cup and Amlin Challenge Cup took place after the Pool 6 Heinieken Cup match between London Wasps and Toulouse on 23 January 2011. The draw was conducted in the Sky Sports booth by Ieuan Evans and Jean-Pierre Lux, Chairman of ERC, at Adams Park, High Wycombe.

In last season's Challenge Cup, any semi-final that involved a club that started the season in the Challenge Cup and a club that started in the Heineken Cup would be hosted by the club that started in the Challenge Cup. This rule was abandoned for 2010–11; the home club in each semi-final is now determined strictly by the draw.

Final
The final of the Amlin Challenge Cup took place at Cardiff City Stadium on 20 May 2011. Harlequins won the trophy for the third time with a 19–18 victory over Stade Francais.

Individual statistics

Top points scorers

Top try scorers

References

 
2010–11 rugby union tournaments for clubs
2010–11 in European rugby union
2010–11 in Irish rugby union
2010–11 in English rugby union
2010–11 in French rugby union
2010–11 in Italian rugby union
2010–11 in Romanian rugby union
2010–11 in Spanish rugby union
2009